Rokometno društvo Jadran Hrpelje-Kozina, commonly referred to as RD Jadran Hrpelje-Kozina or simply Jadran, is a handball club from Hrpelje, Slovenia. The club dropped out of the Slovenian First League of Handball in 2009 due to financial problems, and was reestablished in the same year.

History

Name changes

Club names through history:
 RK Hrpelje (1965–1966)
 RK Jadran (1966–1982)
 RK Astra Jadran (1982–1992)
 RK Andor Jadran (1992–1994)
 Primorske novice Jadran (1994–1996)
 RK Jadran (1996–2000)
 RK Pivka Perutninarstvo (2000–2003)
 RK Gold Club (2003–2009)
 RD Jadran Hrpelje-Kozina (2009–present)

Honours

Domestic
Winners of the Slovenian Handball Cup in the 2004–05 season

European
EHF Cup 1995–96 – 1/16 Finals
EHF CL 2006–07 – 1/8 Finals
EHF Cup 2007–08 – Round 3

References

Handball clubs established in 1965
Slovenian handball clubs
1965 establishments in Slovenia
Sports clubs disestablished in 2009
2009 establishments in Slovenia
Municipality of Hrpelje-Kozina